Fenwick & West LLP is a law firm of nearly 430 attorneys with offices in Silicon Valley, San Francisco, Seattle, New York City, Santa Monica, Washington, DC and Shanghai. The firm's practice focuses on technology companies, life sciences companies and start-ups. Fenwick's lawyers are divided among four primary practice groups, with numerous subgroups within each: Corporate, Litigation, Tax and Intellectual Property. Most recently the firm has been embroiled in scandal surrounding their representation of FTX, having vouched for the company aiding their fraud.

Milestones

2022 

 Fenwick allegedly assists their client, the now bankrupt cryptocurrency exchange, FTX in creating shell companies to launder money.

2014 

 Fenwick represents WhatsApp in its $16 billion acquisition by Facebook

2013 

 Fenwick announces a new version of the Series Seed Documents on GitHub, curated by Fenwick Partner Ted Wang.

2012 

 Fenwick represents Facebook in its $1 billion purchase of Instagram
Fenwick represents Facebook in its IPO, the largest Internet IPO in U.S. history

2011 

Pro bono counsel to Democratic Underground in Righthaven LLC v. Democratic Underground LLC, which is widely regarded as a legal victory against copyright trolls and called Copyright Case of the Year by Managing Intellectual Property

2000 

Handles VeriSign's $21 billion acquisition of Network Solutions, the largest internet merger in history

Clients
 FTX: Helped in key aspects of now bankrupt cryptocurrency exchange, FTX. 
 Apple Computer: Apple was a very early client of the firm; the firm advised Steve Jobs and Steve Wozniak on the incorporation of the company and also advised Apple on the creation of the first shrinkwrap license agreement in 1976. 
 eBay: Fenwick advised eBay on its IPO.
 Facebook: In 2012, Fenwick & West represented Facebook in the largest tech IPO in history. Fenwick also advised Facebook on its acquisition of Instagram in 2013. 
 Oracle: Fenwick advised Oracle on its IPO.
 Wang Laboratories: Created the first clean room protocols for software, which later became an industry standard to prevent IP infringement.

References

External links
Fenwick & West website

Law in the San Francisco Bay Area
Law firms established in 1972
Law firms based in California